General elections were held in Barbados in November 1946. The Barbados Labour Party emerged as the largest party, winning nine of the 24 seats. Following the election, ministerial portfolios were introduced.

Results

References

1946 elections in the Caribbean
1946 in Barbados
Elections in Barbados
Election and referendum articles with incomplete results
November 1946 events in North America